Charles Phelps may refer to:

Charles Phelps (politician) (1852–1940), American attorney, politician, and the first Connecticut Attorney General
Charles E. Phelps (1833–1908), American Civil War general and congressman
Charles E. Phelps (professor), provost of the University of Rochester
Charles D. Phelps (1937–1985), American physician
Charles A. Phelps (1820–1902), American physician, diplomat, and politician
Chuck Phelps, American Baptist pastor
Chuck Phelps (drummer)

See also
Charles Phelps (given name)